Juanulloa, the goldfingers, are a genus of flowering plants in the family Solanaceae, native to Central and South America.

Species
It is likely that Juanulloa is polyphyletic. Species currently accepted by The Plant List are as follows: 
Juanulloa ferruginea Cuatrec. 
Juanulloa globifera (S. Knapp & D'Arcy) S. Knapp 
Juanulloa hookeriana Miers 
Juanulloa mexicana (Schltdl.) Miers 
Juanulloa ochracea Cuatrec.
Juanulloa parasitica Ruiz & Pav. 
Juanulloa parviflora (Ducke) Cuatrec. 
Juanulloa pavonii (Miers) Benth. & Hook. 
Juanulloa speciosa (Miers) Dunal 
Juanulloa verrucosa (Rusby) Hunz. & Subils

References

Solanoideae
Solanaceae genera
Plants described in 1794